Flavia the Heretic (Italian: Flavia, la monaca musulmana, lit. "Flavia, the Muslim nun") is a 1974 Italian-French nunsploitation film directed by Gianfranco Mingozzi.

Plot 
Set in Apulia during Ottoman invasion of Otranto, the film tells the story of Flavia (Florinda Bolkan), a nun who collaborates with the invaders' leader Ahmed (Anthony Higgins as Anthony Corlan) to avenge her past misfortunes.

Cast 
Florinda Bolkan: Flavia Gaetani
María Casares: Sister Agata
Claudio Cassinelli: Abraham
Anthony Higgins: Ahmed
Spiros Focás: French Duke
Diego Michelotti: Flavia's Father
Guido Celano: Chemist
Laura De Marchi: Tarantula Cult Woman

References

External links 
 

1974 films
Nunsploitation films
1970s Italian-language films
French exploitation films
Italian exploitation films
Films set in the 1480s
Films set in Italy
1970s feminist films
Films critical of the Catholic Church
Films directed by Gianfranco Mingozzi
1970s exploitation films
1970s historical films
Films scored by Nicola Piovani
1970s Italian films
1970s French films